Pierre Le Doaré (6 April 1900 – 7 November 1934) was a French racing cyclist. He rode in the 1928 Tour de France.

References

1900 births
1934 deaths
French male cyclists
Place of birth missing